is a marshland located near Nikkō in Tochigi Prefecture, Japan, west of the river Yukawa.

It is about 650,000 m², west of Senjōgahara.

All private car traffic is banned in this area to keep the area free from pollution. In place are low emission buses which shuttle visitors back and forth to Nikkō.

References

Wetlands of Japan
Landforms of Tochigi Prefecture
Ramsar sites in Japan